Bartholomew (died after 1285) was a Hungarian prelate in the second half of the 13th century, who served as Bishop of Várad (present-day Oradea, Romania) from 1284 to 1285.

Family and early life 
Bartholomew was born into a noble family – it is known as Tekesh's kinship in Hungarian historiography – which possessed landholdings in Sáros County. His father was Bot (or Both). He had a brother Benedict. His uncle was Tekesh, a powerful ispán of Sáros County. One of his cousins was Stephen, son of Tekesh. Formerly, historians Vince Bunyitay and Erik Fügedi claimed that Bartholomew originated from the gens (clan) Mezőpilis as the son of Bás (II).

Bartholomew attended the University of Bologna. According to a record, he bought a codex which contains the notes of Accursius for 42 bolognini and 10 soldi in September 1265.

Career 
The name of Bartholomew is first mentioned by contemporary records in Hungary in 1274, on the occasion of an land contract along with his relatives. Sometime after 1276, he was elected provost of Eger. He is mentioned in this capacity from 1278 to 1279. He was styled as special royal notary in 1279 too. He was succeeded as provost by Haab in 1280. Bartholomew was made vice-chancellor of the royal court sometime in the first half of 1280. His appointment took place after a group of barons captured King Ladislaus IV of Hungary, who had earlier imprisoned papal legate Philip of Fermo. At that time, Matthew Csák and Finta Aba dominated the royal council – the Tekesh kinship enjoyed the patronage of the latter, for instance Bartholomew's cousin, Stephen was Voivode of Transylvania at the same time. Bartholomew was replaced as vice-chancellor by Acho, a confidant of Ladislaus IV in the spring of 1281.

Sometime between September 1281 and March 1282, Bartholomew was re-installed as vice-chancellor. He held the position until 1284. Beside that, he functioned as provost of Szepes (today Spišská Kapitula in Spišské Podhradie, Slovakia) from 1283 to 1284. In this capacity, he returned the estate Szék (present-day Slatvina, Slovakia) to the chapter. Bartholomew served as Bishop of Várad from 1284 at least until 1285. His successor Benedict appears in this dignity since only 1287. Bartholomew acted as judge in various trials by ordeal in Bihar County.

References

Sources 

 
 
 
 
 

1280s deaths
13th-century Hungarian people
Bishops of Várad
13th-century Roman Catholic bishops in Hungary
University of Bologna alumni